New North Reformed Low Dutch Church (also known as Saddle River Reformed Church and The Old Stone Church) is a historic Reformed church on East Saddle River Road at Old Stone Church Road in Upper Saddle River, Bergen County, New Jersey, United States. The church was built in 1819 and added to the National Register of Historic Places on April 15, 1982.

See also 
 National Register of Historic Places listings in Bergen County, New Jersey

References

External links
 Official church website
 
 

Churches on the National Register of Historic Places in New Jersey
Churches in Bergen County, New Jersey
Reformed Church in America churches in New Jersey
National Register of Historic Places in Bergen County, New Jersey
Upper Saddle River, New Jersey
New Jersey Register of Historic Places
19th-century churches in the United States
Historic American Buildings Survey in New Jersey
Stone churches in New Jersey